The National Student Financial Aid Scheme (NSFAS) is a South African government student financial aid scheme which provides financial aid to undergraduate students to help pay for the cost of their tertiary education after finishing high school. It is funded by the Department of Higher Education and Training. The program also manages bursaries such as the Funza Lushaka Teacher Bursary (for students pursuing a teaching qualification), DHET Disability Bursary and other bursaries from the Sector Education and Training Authorities (SETAs).

History

The National Student Financial Aid Scheme was established in 1996, replacing the Tertiary Education Fund of South Africa (TEFSA) in 1999. The TEFSA program was a non-profit company which managed and administered NSFAS since its establishment until 2000. In 1999, TEFSA was converted into a statutory body called NSFAS. The scheme is supported by over R30 billion in funding from the Department of Higher Education and Training, and local and international donations. The bursaries cover the tuition fees, accommodation, and food and travel allowances for "full time" students, and only tuition fees for "part time" students.

In 2019, NSFAS had received 365,922 applications for financial aid in 2020, compared to the 278,738 applications it had received the year prior.

In 2019, Minister of Higher Education, Science and Technology Dr Blade Nzimande stated that the government had allocated nearly R80 billion for NSFAS over the next three years.

Financial aid

Qualifiers 
South Africa citizens registering for the first time at a public South African higher education institution who meet the means test may receive a bursary. The means test requires that the applicant's combined household income (gross) does not exceed R350,000 per annum. The bursary also covers a few post-graduate student qualifications (such as a postgraduate certificate in education).

Those who do not qualify for NSFAS (due to not meeting the means test), can still apply for bursaries and scholarships if they need funding for their tertiary studies.

Loan repayment (pre-2018)

Prior to the announcement by former President Jacob Zuma of free higher education for poor students in 2017, NSFAS bursaries were "loans" which needed to be paid back. The loan repayment began once the student had found employment and was earning R80,000 or more annually. If the student was unemployed, they did not have to make repayments until they were employed. If the student left university or college, a case where they did not complete their qualification, the loan would still have to be repaid. , all accrued "loans" from NSFAS prior to 2018 must still be paid back.

Free subsidised higher education (post-2018) 
On 16 December 2017, former President Jacob Zuma announced that "fully subsidised free higher education and training for poor and working class South African students" would be phased in by the South African government over a period of five years.

In March 2021, the NSFAS announced that its funding was insufficient to fund first-year students. In the same month, the NSFAS's executive board faced criticism for incurring billions of rands in irregular expenditures for the last three years, including R522 million in the past year.

Application process 

Applications for a NSFAS bursary can be made both online and in-person. Applications are typically open between September and November in the year preceding the first year of higher education. Online applications can be made on the NSFAS website. Applications can also be made at the Financial Aid Office (FAO) or Student Service Centre at the higher education institution the student applied at, as well as at National Youth Development Agency (NYDA) offices.

References

External links
Bursaries and Scholarships - funding for tertiary studies
The Official NSFAS Site
Department of Education (SA) - Funding Your Studies

Higher education in South Africa
1996 establishments in South Africa
Student loan systems
Higher Education and Training
Education in South Africa
South Africa, Higher